Chloroharpax is a genus of praying mantis in the family Hymenopodidae. The genus is monotypic, being represented by a single species, Chloroharpax modesta, commonly called the Nigerian flower mantis, and is found across West Africa.

Description
Both males and females are about 3-4 centimeters in length when adult while 1st instar nymphs are about 4-5 millimeters in length. The adults are bright green with rounded blue eyes; adult females have a pair yellow ocellated eyespots on their wings. The species is able to hunt prey larger than itself, attacking and chasing its prey.

Range
Ivory Coast, Guinea, Ghana, Republic of the Congo, Gabon and Cameroon.

Captivity
Chloroharpax modesta are kept in captivity.

See also
List of mantis genera and species

References

Hymenopodidae
Mantodea genera
Mantodea of Africa
Insects described in 1883
Monotypic insect genera